Edward Paul Donato (born April 28, 1969) is an American former ice hockey player who played in the National Hockey League (NHL), and is currently the head coach at Harvard University. Born in Boston, Massachusetts, Donato grew up in Dedham, a suburb to the southwest. His son Ryan was selected by the Boston Bruins in the 2014 NHL Entry Draft and currently plays with the expansion Seattle Kraken of the NHL.

Playing career
Donato was selected 98th overall in the 1987 NHL Entry Draft by the Boston Bruins.  He played his high school hockey at Catholic Memorial, college hockey at Harvard University, and then moved up to the NHL for the 1991–92 season. Donato played 796 career NHL games, scoring 150 goals and 197 assists for 347 points. During his career, Donato played for the Bruins, New York Islanders, Ottawa Senators, Mighty Ducks of Anaheim, Dallas Stars, Los Angeles Kings, St. Louis Blues, and New York Rangers.

He played his youth hockey for the Hyde Park Eagles, a Boston neighborhood organization, where a banner still hangs honoring his time playing for Hyde Park Youth Hockey.

Donato is the second professional hockey player to appear on the show The Price Is Right (winning his way on-stage and making it to the Showcase Showdown), the first player in the NHL to appear.

Donato is currently the head coach of his alma mater, Harvard University.

Career statistics

Regular season and playoffs

International

Head coaching record

Awards and honors

References

External links

1969 births
American men's ice hockey left wingers
Boston Bruins draft picks
Boston Bruins players
Bridgeport Sound Tigers players
Dallas Stars players
Hartford Wolf Pack players
Harvard Crimson men's ice hockey coaches
Harvard Crimson men's ice hockey players
Ice hockey people from Boston
Ice hockey players at the 1992 Winter Olympics
Living people
Los Angeles Kings players
Manchester Monarchs (AHL) players
Mighty Ducks of Anaheim players
New York Islanders players
New York Rangers players
Olympic ice hockey players of the United States
Ottawa Senators players
Sportspeople from Dedham, Massachusetts
Providence Bruins players
St. Louis Blues players
TuTo players
NCAA men's ice hockey national champions